Alejandro Encinas Rodríguez (born May 13, 1954) is a Mexican left-wing politician previously affiliated with the Party of the Democratic Revolution, the Unified Socialist Party of Mexico, the Mexican Socialist Party and the Mexican Communist Party. He served as the 4th Head of Government of the Federal District from 2005 to 2006. Encinas serves in the upper house of Congress as senator representing the State of Mexico.

Alejandro Encinas has a degree in economics from the National Autonomous University of Mexico.  
He is a former researcher of the United Nations Economic Commission for Latin America and the Caribbean and served twice in the Chamber of Deputies (1985–1988 and 1991–1994).

In 2000 he ran for chief administrator of Álvaro Obregón, a borough of Mexico City. He lost against the conservative Luis Eduardo Zuno Chavira.

Encinas served in the cabinet of Andrés Manuel López Obrador (AMLO) until AMLO's resignation. He was the Head of Government of the Federal District from August 1, 2005, to December 4, 2006. He was succeeded by Marcelo Ebrard.

Encinas'  provided official support for López Obrador's presidential campaign during the 2006 Mexican general election, and later support of the blockade of avenues in Mexico City.

He is also the Minister of Environment, Minister of Economic Development, Government Secretary and Head of Government of the Federal District.

References

External links
 Government of the Mexican Federal District: Alejandro Encinas

1954 births
Heads of Government of Mexico City
Living people
Mexican economists
Members of the Chamber of Deputies (Mexico)
Members of the Senate of the Republic (Mexico)
National Autonomous University of Mexico alumni
Academic staff of the Chapingo Autonomous University
Party of the Democratic Revolution politicians
Politicians from Mexico City
20th-century Mexican politicians
21st-century Mexican politicians
Members of the Constituent Assembly of Mexico City
Mexican social democrats